FK506-binding protein like, also known as FKBPL, is a protein that in humans is encoded by the FKBPL gene.

Function 
FKBPL has similarity to the immunophilin protein family, which play a role in immunoregulation and basic cellular processes involving protein folding and trafficking. The encoded protein is thought to have a potential role in the induced radioresistance. Also it appears to have some involvement in the control of the cell cycle.

FKBPL is involved in cellular response to stress. It was first isolated in 1999 and was initially named DIR1. It was later reclassified because of its homology to the FKBP family of proteins and was renamed FKBP-like (FKBPL).  A separate study that found it to be involved in the stabilisation of newly synthesised p21 termed it Wisp39.

It is known to interact with Hsp90, glucocorticoid receptor and dynamitin and may play a role in signalling, like other FKBPs.

FKBPL has also been shown to influence estrogen receptor signalling and can have a determinant effect on response to the breast cancer drug tamoxifen.

References

EC 5.2.1
Co-chaperones